Chief Monisade Christiana Afuye  (born 28 September 1958) is a Nigerian politician who has served as deputy governor of Ekiti State since 2022.

Biography 
Monisade Christiana Afuye was born on 28 September 1958 on Ikere-Ekiti, Ikere local government area. She had her primary education at Saint Joseph CAC Primary School Aramoko, Aramoko Ekiti, and her secondary education at Amoye Grammar school, Ikere-Ekiti. She earned her Ordinary National Diploma and Higher National Diploma in Public Administration from Crown Polytechnic, Ado Ekiti, Ekiti State.

References 

Living people
1958 births
Yoruba politicians
People from Ekiti State
All Progressives Congress politicians